Thomas Simpson Penny (15 July 1929 – 26 July 1983) was an English first-class cricketer.
 
Penny was born at Bristol in July 1929. He was educated at Clifton College, before going up to Magdalen College, Oxford. While studying at Oxford, he played first-class cricket for Oxford University in 1951 and 1952, making five appearances. He scored 73 runs in his five matches, with a high score of 34. With his right-arm off break bowling, he took 11 wickets at an average of 36.36 and best figures of 4 for 75. After graduating from Oxford, Penny became a schoolteacher, teaching at Canford School amongst others. He died in July 1983 at Casterton, Cumberland.

References

External links

1929 births
1983 deaths
Cricketers from Bristol
People educated at Clifton College
Alumni of Magdalen College, Oxford
English cricketers
Oxford University cricketers
Schoolteachers from Dorset